The 2018 All-Ireland Under-21 Hurling Championship was the 55th and last staging of the All-Ireland Under-21 Hurling Championship since its establishment by the Gaelic Athletic Association in 1964. The championship began on 7 May 2018 and ended on 26 August 2018.

Limerick were the defending champions, however, they were defeated by Tipperary in the Munster semi-final.

On 26 August 2018, Tipperary won the championship following a 3-13 to 1-16 defeat of Cork in the All-Ireland final. This was their 10th All-Ireland title overall and their first in eight championship seasons. They were the first team ever to win the All-Ireland title after being defeated in the Munster Championship.

Format change

Central Council motions to alter the format of the championship were endorsed by the Gaelic Athletic Association's Special Congress on 30 September 2017. The proposal to allow Galway and Ulster teams as agreed by the Leinster and Ulster Councils into the Leinster Championship was backed by 72% of delegates. The original recommendation would have ended All-Ireland semi-finals as the Munster winners were set to face off against the Leinster winners from 2018 onwards. Cork argued that the All-Ireland semi-finals should be retained with the Munster champions taking on the runners-up in Leinster and vice versa. Their idea was endorsed by 78% of delegates.

This was the final year of the under-21 championship as the GAA Congress voted on 24 February 2018 to change to an under-20 championship in 2019.

Team summaries

Leinster Under-21 Hurling Championship

Playoff Round 1

Playoff Round 2

Quarter-finals

Semi-finals

Final

Munster Under-21 Hurling Championship

Quarter-final

Semi-finals

Final

All-Ireland Under-21 Hurling Championship

All-Ireland Semi-Finals

All-Ireland final

Championship statistics

Top scorers

Top scorers overall

Top scorers in a single game

Miscellaneous

 Cork won the Munster title for the first time since 2007.
 Cork qualified for the All-Ireland final for the first time since 1998.
 Tipperary became the first team to be beaten in the provincial championship and still qualify for the All-Ireland final.

Awards
2018 Bord Gáis Energy Team of the Year was announced on 17 October.	

1 Ger Collins (Cork)
2 Killian O’Dwyer (Tipperary)
3 Brian McGrath (Tipperary)
4 Niall O’Leary (Cork)
5 Fintan Burke (Galway)
6 Robert Byrne (Tipperary)
7 Billy Hennessy (Cork)
8 Mark Coleman (Cork)
9 Ger Browne (Tipperary)
10 Robbie O’Flynn (Cork)
11 Rory O’Connor (Wexford)
12 Cianan Fahy (Galway)
13 Jake Morris (Tipperary)
14 Tim O’Mahony (Cork)
15 Seamus Casey (Wexford)

References

Under-21
All-Ireland Under-21 Hurling Championship